Horace Richardson (born September 28, 1993) is a former American football cornerback. He played college football at SMU.

Professional career

Minnesota Vikings
Richardson signed with the Minnesota Vikings as an undrafted free agent on May 5, 2017. He was waived on September 2, 2017 and was signed to the practice squad the next day. He signed a reserve/future contract with the Vikings on January 22, 2018.

On September 1, 2018, Richardson was waived/injured by the Vikings and placed on injured reserve. He was released on October 9, 2018.

Detroit Lions
On November 6, 2018, Richardson was signed to the Detroit Lions practice squad. He was released on November 20, 2018.

Kansas City Chiefs
On December 5, 2018, Richardson was signed to the Kansas City Chiefs practice squad.

Denver Broncos
On December 28, 2018, Richardson was signed by the Denver Broncos off the Chiefs practice squad.

On August 21, 2019, Richardson was placed on injured reserve.

On March 5, 2020, Richardson was released by the Broncos.

References

External links
SMU Mustangs bio

1993 births
Living people
American football cornerbacks
Denver Broncos players
Detroit Lions players
Kansas City Chiefs players
Minnesota Vikings players
People from Tarrant County, Texas
Players of American football from Texas
SMU Mustangs football players
Sportspeople from the Dallas–Fort Worth metroplex